The Arabia is a side wheeler steamboat that sank in the Missouri River near what today is Kansas City, Kansas, on September 5, 1856. The boat sank after hitting a tree snag submerged in the river, and was rediscovered in 1988 by a team of local researchers. Artifacts recovered from the site are now housed in the Arabia Steamboat Museum.

History 

The Arabia was built in 1853 around the Monongahela River in Brownsville, Pennsylvania. It averaged five miles (8 km) an hour going upstream. It traveled the Ohio and Mississippi rivers before it was bought by Captain John Shaw, who operated it on the Missouri River. Its first trip was to carry 109 soldiers from Fort Leavenworth to Fort Pierre, which was located up river in South Dakota. It then traveled up the Yellowstone River, adding  to the trip. In all, the trip took nearly three months to complete.

In March 1856, the Arabia was sold to Captain William Terrill and William Boyd, and it made fourteen trips up and down the Missouri during their ownership. In March, it collided with an obstacle (either a rock or a sand bar), nearly sinking with a damaged rudder. Repairs were made in nearby Portland. A few weeks later it blew a cylinder head and had to be repaired again.

Also in March 1856, the Arabia was stopped and searched by pro-slavery Border Ruffians near Lexington, Missouri.  According to newspaper accounts at the time, a Pennsylvania abolitionist aboard the Arabia dropped a letter, which was discovered and handed over to Captain Shaw. The letter described guns and cannons en route to the slavery-free Kansas Territory from the abolitionist Massachusetts Aid Society. The weapons were discovered in boxes labeled "Carpenters Tools" and confiscated.

Sinking

On September 5, 1856, the Arabia set out for a routine trip. At Quindaro Bend, near the town of Parkville, Missouri, it hit a submerged sycamore tree snag. The snag ripped open the hull, which rapidly filled with water. The upper decks stayed above water, and the only casualty was a mule that was tied to sawmill equipment and overlooked.

The boat sank so rapidly into the mud that by the next morning, only the smokestacks and pilot house remained visible. Within a few days, these traces were also swept away. Numerous salvage attempts failed, and eventually the Arabia was completely covered by water. Over time, the river shifted a half a mile (800 m) to the east. The site of the sinking is in a field in the area of present-day Kansas City, Kansas.

Excavation
In the 1860s, Elisha Sortor purchased the property where the Arabia lay. Over the years, legends were passed through the family that it was located somewhere under the land. In the surrounding town, stories were also told of it, but the exact location of it was lost over time.

In 1987, Bob Hawley and his sons, Greg and David, set out to find the Arabia. They used old maps and a proton magnetometer to figure out the probable location, and finally discovered it half a mile (800 m) from the modern location of the river under  of silt and topsoil.

The owners of the farm gave permission for excavation, with the condition that the work be completed before the spring planting. The Hawleys, along with family friends Jerry Mackey and David Luttrell, set out to excavate the Arabia during the winter months while the water table was at its lowest point. They performed a series of drilling tests to determine the exact location of the hull, then marked the perimeter with powdered chalk. Heavy equipment, including a 100-ton crane, was brought in by both river and road transport during the summer and fall. 20 irrigation pumps were installed around the site to lower the water level and to keep the site from flooding.

On November 26, 1988, the Arabia was exposed. Four days later, artifacts from it began to appear, beginning with a vulcanized rubber overshoe. On December 5, a wooden crate filled with elegant china was unearthed. The mud was such an effective preserver that the yellow packing straw was still visible. Thousands of artifacts were recovered intact, including jars of preserved apples that are still edible. The artifacts that were recovered are housed in the Arabia Steamboat Museum.

On February 11, 1989, work ceased at the site, and the pumps were turned off. The hole filled with water overnight. After the pumps were turned off, the site was filled back in and remains farmland.

References

External links

Arabia Steamboat Museum
Interview with David and Greg Hawley who uncovered the boat (with NEH Chairman Bruce Cole in 2004)

1853 ships
Ships built in Brownsville, Pennsylvania
Steamboats of the Mississippi River
Paddle steamers of the United States
Shipwrecks of the Missouri River
Disasters in Missouri
History of Kansas City, Missouri
Missouri River
Steamboats of the Missouri River
Transportation disasters in Missouri
Maritime incidents in September 1856
1988 archaeological discoveries